The 9th Legislative Yuan is a session of the Legislative Yuan of Taiwan, from 1 February 2016 to 31 January 2020. Members were elected in the 16 January 2016 legislative election. The ruling Democratic Progressive Party control the Legislative Yuan for the first time. The next legislative election was held on January 11, 2020 for the Tenth Legislative Yuan.

The list is arranged by single-member constituency (district) and party-list proportional representation.

Single-member Constituency

Party-list Proportional Representation

Members resigned during tenure

References

 
09